Julius Nyerere International Airport  is the international airport of Dar es Salaam, the largest city in Tanzania. The airport has flights to destinations in Africa, Asia, Europe, and the Middle East. It is named after Julius Nyerere, the nation's first president.

History

In October 2005, "Dar es Salaam International Airport" (DIA) was renamed "Mwalimu Julius Kambarage Nyerere International Airport" and on 1 November 2006, "Julius Nyerere International Airport". A total of 9,501,265 passengers used the airport from 1980 to 2004, averaging 2,770 passengers per day.

In April 2013, the Tanzania Airports Authority signed a TSH 275 billion contract with BAM International of the Netherlands for the construction of the first phase of Terminal III, with a capacity of 3.5 million passengers per year. In November 2015, the second phase was also awarded to BAM, at a contract price of US$110 million, and will add capacity for an additional 2.5 million passengers per year. After completion of Terminal III, it is expected that Terminal II will be devoted solely to domestic passengers. It is proposed to build a rail shuttle link from the airport to the city and rail coaches have already been bought for this (2014).

The new Terminal 3 was constructed using the local funding, and it started its operation in August 2019. In October 2022, it was announced that Terminal 2 is all set to be renovated soon by the Government of Tanzania. In February 2022, Tanzania Airports Authority announced their plans of developing a four-star hotel and commercial complex at Julius Nyerere International Airport (JNIA).

Terminals
There are three terminals at Dar es Salaam airport.

Terminal 1
Is a small terminal that handles chartered and private flights. It has an annual capacity of handling 500,000 passengers.
This small terminal's operations as an International Airport ceased in 1984 after completion of Terminal II.

Terminal 2
Is used for domestic and regional scheduled flights. It has a capacity of handling 1.5 million passengers.

Terminal 3
Is the newest terminal that opened in August 2019. It is used for International flights. The terminal consists of two phases, Phase I and II. There are 58 businesses in the terminal categorized under retails, operational machines and provision of services.

Airlines and destinations

Passenger

The following passenger airlines operate at the airport:

Cargo

Notes:
: Some of KLM's inbound/outbound flights to/from Amsterdam to Dar es Salaam make a stop in Kilimanjaro, some make a stop in Zanzibar (from 10 December 2020) while others are nonstop. However, the airline does not have traffic rights to transport passengers solely between Kilimanjaro/Zanzibar and Dar es Salaam.

Statistics

Aircraft accidents and incidents
On 3 January 1950, United Air Services flight, flying an Avro Anson C.19 with registration VP-TAT, crash landed at Dar es Salaam International Airport, killing both cargo crew members.
On 18 May 1989, an Aeroflot flight flying an Ilyushin 62 was hijacked by a South African after the plane took off from Luanda, Angola. The hijacker was armed with a grenade and attempted to hold hostage the occupants of the plane that carried members of the African National Congress. The hijacker was shot by a security guard as he attempted to enter the cockpit. The plane continued its scheduled stop at Dar es Salaam International Airport.
On 11 April 2014, Kenya Airways flight KQ-482 flying an Embraer ERJ-190AR had a landing accident upon landing in heavy rains. The plane veered off the runway. All passengers and crew were evacuated, there were no reported fatalities and 3 passengers sustained minor injuries.

References

External links

Airports in Tanzania
Transport in Dar es Salaam
A
Buildings and structures in the Dar es Salaam Region